Teemu Virtanen (born January 9, 1990) is a Finnish professional ice hockey player who played with Ilves in the SM-liiga during the 2010–11 season.

References

External links

1990 births
Finnish ice hockey defencemen
Ilves players
Living people